Am I the Enemy is the third studio album by American rock band The Red Jumpsuit Apparatus.

Composition and recording
The album marks a return to the aggressive post-hardcore sound of their debut album as opposed to the polished hard rock featured on Lonely Road. The album saw the band working with famed punk/hardcore producer John Feldmann, who has previously worked with such bands as Escape the Fate, Story of the Year, The Used and Saosin. Feldmann also mixed the album, and arranged and co-wrote all the songs on the album along with vocalist Ronnie Winter.

"Choke" has previously appeared on the band's 2010 The Hell or High Water EP and was released as that EP's lead single.

Release
The lead single, "Reap", was released to radio stations on March 24, 2011 and later released on iTunes on April 26. Two other tracks from the album, "Salvation" and "Fall from Grace", were released on YouTube on May 24. "Dive Too Deep", the second single off the album, and "Dreams" were released through GRAMMY.com and Rolling Stone magazine, respectively, on July 27. July 31 saw the premiere of another song, "Where Are the Heroes?", on Alternative Addiction. Another song, "Don't Lose Hope", was streamed on AOL's music blog on August 8. The album went up for pre-order on iTunes on August 10.

The song "Wake Me Up" was streamed on Alternative Press's website on August 14. "Am I the Enemy" was released to radio on August 16, 2011. It was released on August 30, 2011.

Track listing
All lyrics written by Ronnie Winter. All music written by Ronnie Winter and John Feldmann, except where noted.

Reception

The album received generally mixed reviews upon release.

Personnel
The Red Jumpsuit Apparatus
Ronnie Winter – lead vocals, keyboard
Matt Carter – lead guitar
Duke Kitchens – rhythm guitar
Joey Westwood – bass guitar
Jon Wilkes – drums, percussion

Production
John Feldmann – producer, arranger, composer, engineer, mixing, programming, vocals
Brandon Paddock – arranger, engineer, programming
Spencer Hoad – engineer
Joe Gastwirt – mastering

References

2011 albums
The Red Jumpsuit Apparatus albums
Emo albums by American artists
Albums produced by John Feldmann